|}

The Pretty Polly Stakes is a Group 1 flat horse race in Ireland open to thoroughbred fillies and mares aged three years or older. It is run at the Curragh over a distance of 1 mile and 2 furlongs (2,012 metres), and it is scheduled to take place each year in late June or early July.

History
The event is named after Pretty Polly, a successful filly foaled in Ireland in 1901. It was originally restricted to fillies aged three, but it was later opened to older horses. For a period it was classed at Group 2 level, and it was promoted to Group 1 status in 2004.

The Pretty Polly Stakes was part of the Breeders' Cup Challenge series from 2009 to 2012. The winner earned an automatic invitation to compete in the same year's Breeders' Cup Filly & Mare Turf. 

The race is currently held on the final day of the Curragh's three-day Irish Derby meeting.

Records
Most successful horse (2 wins):
 Dance Design – 1996, 1997
 Alexander Goldrun – 2005, 2006

Leading jockey since 1950 (3 wins):
 Liam Ward – Atlantida (1956), Iskereen (1967), Rimark (1968)
 Bill Williamson – Icy Look (1961), Hibernia (1963), Pidget (1972)
 Johnny Roe – Place d'Etoile (1970), Hurry Harriet (1973), Miss Toshiba (1975)
 Lester Piggott – Mariel (1971), Godetia (1979), Calandra (1980)
 Christy Roche – Alydar's Best (1985), Fleur Royale (1986), Noora Abu (1989)
 Michael Kinane – Market Booster (1992), Dance Design (1996, 1997)
 Seamie Heffernan - Misty For Me (2011), Diamondsandrubies (2015), Magical (2020)

Leading trainer since 1950 (7 wins):
 Vincent O'Brien – Little Mo (1959), Ancasta (1964), Iskereen (1967), Rimark (1968), Godetia (1979), Calandra (1980), Dark Lomond (1988)

Leading owner since 1978 (5 wins) includes joint wins:

 Susan Magnier - Peeping Fawn (2007), Misty For Me (2011), Diamondsandrubies (2015), Minding (2016), Magical (2020)

Winners since 1978

Earlier winners

 1948: Cobaltic
 1949: Circus Lady
 1950: Lonely Maid
 1951: Ash Plant
 1952: Nashua
 1953: Northern Gleam
 1954: Belle Collette
 1955: Free Model
 1956: Atlantida
 1957: After the Show
 1958: Owenello
 1959: Little Mo
 1960: Young Empress
 1961: Icy Look
 1962: Tropic Star
 1963: Hibernia
 1964: Ancasta
 1965: Messene
 1966: Black Gold
 1967: Iskereen
 1968: Rimark
 1969: Borana
 1970: Place d'Etoile
 1971: Mariel
 1972: Pidget
 1973: Hurry Harriet
 1974: Northern Gem
 1975: Miss Toshiba
 1976: Lady Singer
 1977: Claire's Slipper

See also
 Horse racing in Ireland
 List of Irish flat horse races

References

 Paris-Turf:
 Racing Post:

 galopp-sieger.de – Pretty Polly Stakes.
 horseracingintfed.com – International Federation of Horseracing Authorities – Pretty Polly Stakes (2018).
 irishracinggreats.com – Pretty Polly Stakes (Group 1).
 pedigreequery.com – Pretty Polly Stakes – Curragh.

Flat races in Ireland
Curragh Racecourse
Middle distance horse races for fillies and mares